Starting from San Francisco is a collection of poems by Lawrence Ferlinghetti, his third collection and fourth book, published in 1961. 
The hardcover edition included a short vinyl recording of Ferlinghetti reading some of his poems.
The title is a reference to Walt Whitman's "Starting from Paumanok": Ferlinghetti numbered himself among Whitman's "wild children", and Whitman's influence is shown throughout the work.

The poems are based mainly on a journey across the United States and a meditation on the Inca city of Machu Picchu, a photograph of which is shown on the cover.
The poetry mingles tenderness with satire and hallucination. 
Scattered through the book is some of the better poetry generated by the San Francisco School.
The poems are longer and more sustained than in his previous publications. They are more concerned with ideas than with verbal glitter, singing out boldly with great clarity.

The poem "Euphoria" starts:
As I approach the state of pure euphoriaI find I need a large size typewriter caseto carry my underwear inand scars on my conscienceare wounds imbedded inthe gum eraser of my skinwhich still erases itself...

Perhaps the best known of the poems is "The Great Chinese Dragon", although one critic says that the Remedial-English style of this poem makes one doubt that Ferlinghetti would ever be able to write poetry again.
Gregory Stephenson, incorporating quotes from "The Great Chinese Dragon", says the dragon "… represents 'the force and mystery of life,' the true sight that 'sees the spiritual everywhere translucent in the material world.'" Perhaps what Ferlinghetti wants his reader to do is to see the jazz music and the everyday images and the repetitive references to common culture found in his poems; and then see beyond them to "the spiritual everywhere translucent."

Publication history

1961, USA, New Directions Publishing, Hardcover
1967, USA, New Directions Publishing, Paperback

External links

References

1961 poetry books
American poetry collections
Beat poetry
Culture of San Francisco
New Directions Publishing books